La Sirena chilota is an aquatic creature belonging to the Chilote mythology. Perhaps its origin is due to binding of the myths of the Sumpall of the Mapuche mythology and the Mermaid of European mythology. Like to the mermaids, the siren chilota is characterized by a body half fish and half woman, with blond hair and golden scales; and her human side would look like a very beautiful teen. She would be the youngest daughter of Millalobo (king of sea, in Chilote mythology) and the human Huenchula. Commissioned by her father, she has the task of caring for all fish. Also helps her siblings (the Pincoya and Pincoy) to carry the bodies of drowned sailors, toward the Caleuche, for the purpose of reviving the sailors and to be happy. Sirena Chilota have very large flukes and strong tails so they can swim long distances while carrying victims of tragedies. It is also said that a Sirena chilota's tears are very delicate and, if used in a spell, is very powerful.

References
 Narciso García Barría. Tesoro mitológico del archipiélago de Chiloé: bosquejo interpretativo. Andres Bello, 1997 , 978-956-13-1516-7. (Spanish).

Chilote legendary creatures
Water spirits
Mermaids